The Battle of Castellón was an ambush delivered against a French Imperial detachment under General Reille near Girona during the Peninsular War (1807–14).

Background
The Corunna campaign started with the Battle of Cardedeu.

Battle
Having crept his force up along the right bank of the Fluvià River and set up headquarters at La Armentera, a village near the river's mouth on the Mediterranean Sea, General Lazán prepared a coup de main against the French battalion installed atop Castelló d'Empúries. Since bad roads precluded a night attack, Lazán moved in the early morning, and brusquely forced the French off the ridge. Caught in a pincer movement, the French were cut down. Only 80 escaped unwounded and 90 surrendered.

Sequel
When Reille, established at Figueras, learned of the rout of his men, he set out against the Spaniards the next day with 3,000 infantry and cavalry, aiming to cut their communications with Gerona. In spite of the rapid French movements, Reille was unable to achieve a surprise, and Lazán awaited him with his men solidly entrenched at Castellón. Seeing his attacks repulsed everywhere along the line, Reille decided not to try conclusions with the Spaniards, and Lazán fell back on Gerona unmolested.

Aftermath
The Corunna campaign proceeded with the Battle of Mansilla.

External links

Battles of the Peninsular War
Battles of the Napoleonic Wars
Battles involving Spain
Battles involving France
Battles in Catalonia
Battle of Castellón
Battle of Castellón
January 1809 events